Haluaghat is an upazila of Mymensingh District in the Division of Mymensingh, Bangladesh.

Geography
It has 49520 households and total area 356.07 km2.

There is a border checkpoint on the Bangladesh-India border at Haluaghat.

Demographics
According to the 2011 Bangladesh census, Haluaghat had a population of 290,043. Males constituted 49.18% of the population and females 50.82%. Muslims formed 91.34% of the population, Christians 4.40%, Hindus 4.17%, and others 0.09%. Haluaghat had a literacy rate of 38.89% for the population 7 years and above.

As of the 1991 Bangladesh census, Haluaghat had a population of 242,339. Males constituted 50.68% of the population, and females 49.32%. This Upazila's eighteen up population was 122,863. Haluaghat had an average literacy rate of 22.8% (7+ years), and the national average of 32.4% literate.

Indigenous communities in Haluaghat are: Garo, Hajong, Koch, Dalu, Bangshi Barman, Khatrio, Kurmi and Mal.

Administration
Haluaghat Thana was formed in 1916 and it was turned into an upazila in 1983.

The Upazila is divided into 12 union parishads: Amtoil, Bhubankura, Bildora, Dhara, Dhurail, Gazirbhita, Haluaghat, Jugli, Kaichapur, Narail, Sakuai, and Swadeshi. The union parishads are subdivided into 146 mauzas and 214 villages.

See also
Upazilas of Bangladesh
Districts of Bangladesh
Divisions of Bangladesh

References

Upazilas of Mymensingh District